In mathematics, the differential geometry of surfaces deals with the differential geometry of smooth surfaces with various additional structures, most often, a Riemannian metric.
Surfaces have been extensively studied from various perspectives: extrinsically, relating to their embedding in Euclidean space and intrinsically, reflecting their properties determined solely by the distance within the surface as measured along curves on the surface. One of the fundamental concepts investigated is the Gaussian curvature, first studied in depth by Carl Friedrich Gauss, who showed that curvature was an intrinsic property of a surface, independent of its isometric embedding in Euclidean space.

Surfaces naturally arise as graphs of functions of a pair of variables, and sometimes appear in parametric form or as loci associated to space curves. An important role in their study has been played by Lie groups (in the spirit of the Erlangen program), namely the symmetry groups of the Euclidean plane, the sphere and the hyperbolic plane. These Lie groups can be used to describe surfaces of constant Gaussian curvature; they also provide an essential ingredient in the modern approach to intrinsic differential geometry through connections. On the other hand, extrinsic properties relying on an embedding of a surface in Euclidean space have also been extensively studied. This is well illustrated by the non-linear Euler–Lagrange equations in the calculus of variations: although Euler developed the one variable equations to understand geodesics, defined independently of an embedding, one of Lagrange's main applications of the two variable equations was to minimal surfaces, a concept that can only be defined in terms of an embedding.

History 

The volumes of certain quadric surfaces of revolution were calculated by Archimedes.  The development of calculus in the seventeenth century provided a more systematic way of computing them. Curvature of general surfaces was first studied by Euler. In 1760 he proved a formula for the curvature of a plane section of a surface and in 1771 he considered surfaces represented in a parametric form. Monge laid down the foundations of their theory in his classical memoir L'application de l'analyse à la géometrie which appeared in 1795. The defining contribution to the theory of surfaces was made by Gauss in two remarkable papers written in 1825 and 1827. This marked a new departure from tradition because for the first time Gauss considered the intrinsic geometry of a surface, the properties which are determined only by the geodesic distances between points on the surface independently of the particular way in which the surface is located in the ambient Euclidean space. The crowning result, the Theorema Egregium of Gauss, established that the Gaussian curvature is an intrinsic invariant, i.e. invariant under local isometries. This point of view was extended to higher-dimensional spaces by Riemann and led to what is known today as Riemannian geometry. The nineteenth century was the golden age for the theory of surfaces, from both the topological and the differential-geometric point of view, with most leading geometers devoting themselves to their study. Darboux collected many results in his four-volume treatise Théorie des surfaces (1887–1896).

Overview  

It is intuitively quite familiar to say that the leaf of a plant, the surface of a glass, or the shape of a face, are curved in certain ways, and that all of these shapes, even after ignoring any distinguishing markings, have certain geometric features which distinguish one from another. The differential geometry of surfaces is concerned with a mathematical understanding of such phenomena. The study of this field, which was initiated in its modern form in the 1700s, has led to the development of higher-dimensional and abstract geometry, such as Riemannian geometry and general relativity.

The essential mathematical object is that of a regular surface. Although conventions vary in their precise definition, these form a general class of subsets of three-dimensional Euclidean space which capture part of the familiar notion of "surface." Their average is called the mean curvature of the surface, and their product is called the Gaussian curvature.

There are many classic examples of regular surfaces, including:
 familiar examples such as planes, cylinders, and spheres
minimal surfaces, which are defined by the property that their mean curvature is zero at every point. The best-known examples are catenoids and helicoids, although many more have been discovered. Minimal surfaces can also be defined by properties to do with surface area, with the consequence that they provide a mathematical model for the shape of soap films when stretched across a wire frame
ruled surfaces, which are surfaces that have at least one straight line running through every point; examples include the cylinder and the hyperboloid of one sheet.

A surprising result of Carl Friedrich Gauss, known as the theorema egregium, showed that the Gaussian curvature of a surface, which by its definition has to do with how curves on the surface change directions in three dimensional space, can actually be measured by the lengths of curves lying on the surfaces together with the angles made when two curves on the surface intersect. Terminologically, this says that the Gaussian curvature can be calculated from the first fundamental form (also called metric tensor) of the surface. The second fundamental form, by contrast, is an object which encodes how lengths and angles of curves on the surface are distorted when the curves are pushed off of the surface.

Despite measuring different aspects of length and angle, the first and second fundamental forms are not independent from one another, and they satisfy certain constraints called the Gauss-Codazzi equations. A major theorem, often called the fundamental theorem of the differential geometry of surfaces, asserts that whenever two objects satisfy the Gauss-Codazzi constraints, they will arise as the first and second fundamental forms of a regular surface.

Using the first fundamental form, it is possible to define new objects on a regular surface. Geodesics are curves on the surface which satisfy a certain second-order ordinary differential equation which is specified by the first fundamental form. They are very directly connected to the study of lengths of curves; a geodesic of sufficiently short length will always be the curve of shortest length on the surface which connects its two endpoints. Thus, geodesics are fundamental to the optimization problem of determining the shortest path between two given points on a regular surface.

One can also define parallel transport along any given curve, which gives a prescription for how to deform a tangent vector to the surface at one point of the curve to tangent vectors at all other points of the curve. The prescription is determined by a first-order ordinary differential equation which is specified by the first fundamental form.

The above concepts are essentially all to do with multivariable calculus. The Gauss-Bonnet theorem is a more global result, which relates the Gaussian curvature of a surface together with its topological type. It asserts that the average value of the Gaussian curvature is completely determined by the Euler characteristic of the surface together with its surface area.

The notion of Riemannian manifold and Riemann surface are two generalizations of the regular surfaces discussed above. In particular, essentially all of the theory of regular surfaces as discussed here has a generalization in the theory of Riemannian manifolds. This is not the case for Riemann surfaces, although every regular surface gives an example of a Riemann surface.

Regular surfaces in Euclidean space

Definition
It is intuitively clear that a sphere is smooth, while a cone or a pyramid, due to their vertex or edges, are not. The notion of a "regular surface" is a formalization of the notion of a smooth surface. The definition utilizes the local representation of a surface via maps between Euclidean spaces. There is a standard notion of smoothness for such maps; a map between two open subsets of Euclidean space is smooth if its partial derivatives of every order exist at every point of the domain.
	

Functions  as in the third definition are called local defining functions. The equivalence of all three definitions follows from the implicit function theorem.

This shows that any regular surface naturally has the structure of a smooth manifold, with a smooth atlas being given by the inverses of local parametrizations.

In the classical theory of differential geometry, surfaces are usually studied only in the regular case. In this case,  may have singularities such as cuspidal edges. Such surfaces are typically studied in singularity theory. Other weakened forms of regular surfaces occur in computer-aided design, where a surface is broken apart into disjoint pieces, with the derivatives of local parametrizations failing to even be continuous along the boundaries.

Simple examples. A simple example of a regular surface is given by the 2-sphere }; this surface can be covered by six Monge patches (two of each of the three types given above), taking . It can also be covered by two local parametrizations, using stereographic projection. It is a regular surface; local parametrizations can be given of the form

The helicoid appears in the theory of minimal surfaces. It is covered by a single local parametrization, .

Tangent vectors and normal vectors

It is useful to note that the unit normal vectors at  can be given in terms of local parametrizations, Monge patches, or local defining functions, via the formulas

following the same notations as in the previous definitions.

It is also useful to note an "intrinsic" definition of tangent vectors, which is typical of the generalization of regular surface theory to the setting of smooth manifolds.

where  is the Jacobian matrix of the mapping , evaluated at the point . A tangent vector in this sense corresponds to a tangent vector in the previous sense by considering the vector

 
For smooth functions on a surface, vector fields (i.e. tangent vector fields) have an important interpretation as first order operators or derivations. Let  be a regular surface,  an open subset of the plane and  a coordinate chart. The first order differential operator  is a derivation, i.e. it satisfies the Leibniz rule 
 	
For vector fields  and  it is simple to check that the operator  is a derivation corresponding to a vector field. It is called the Lie bracket . It is skew-symmetric  and satisfies the Jacobi identity:
 	

 

First and second fundamental forms, the shape operator, and the curvature
The key relation in establishing the formulas of the fourth column is then

as follows by the chain rule.

By a direct calculation with the matrix defining the shape operator, it can be checked that the Gaussian curvature is the determinant of the shape operator, the mean curvature is half of the trace of the shape operator, and the principal curvatures are the eigenvalues of the shape operator; moreover the Gaussian curvature is the product of the principal curvatures and the mean curvature is their sum. These observations can also be formulated as definitions of these objects. These observations also make clear that the last three rows of the fourth column follow immediately from the previous row, as similar matrices have identical determinant, trace, and eigenvalues. This ensures that the matrix inverse in the definition of the shape operator is well-defined, and that the principal curvatures are real numbers.

Note also that a negation of the choice of unit normal vector field will negate the second fundamental form, the shape operator, the mean curvature, and the principal curvatures, but will leave the Gaussian curvature unchanged.

In particular, the first fundamental form encodes how quickly  moves, while the second fundamental form encodes the extent to which its motion is in the direction of the normal vector . This thinking can be made precise by the formulas

as follows directly from the definitions of the fundamental forms and Taylor's theorem in two dimensions. The principal curvatures can be viewed in the following way.

The following summarizes the calculation of the above quantities relative to a Monge patch . The second fundamental form and all subsequent quantities are calculated relative to the given choice of unit normal vector field.

Christoffel symbols, Gauss–Codazzi equations, and the Theorema Egregium

The second definition shows, in the context of local parametrizations, that the Christoffel symbols are geometrically natural. Although the formulas in the first definition appear less natural, they have the importance of showing that the Christoffel symbols can be calculated from the first fundamental form, which is not immediately apparent from the second definition.

The Codazzi equations assert that

The Gauss equation asserts that

Although these are written as three separate equations, they are identical when the definitions of the Christoffel symbols, in terms of the first fundamental form, are substituted in. There are many ways to write the resulting expression, one of them derived in 1852 by Brioschi using a skillful use of determinants:

When the Christoffel symbols are considered as being defined by the first fundamental form, the Gauss and Codazzi equations represent certain constraints between the first and second fundamental forms. This is known as the theorema egregium, and was a major discovery of Carl Friedrich Gauss. As said by Marcel Berger:

The Gauss-Codazzi equations can also be succinctly expressed and derived in the language of connection forms due to Élie Cartan. Pierre Bonnet proved that two quadratic forms satisfying the Gauss-Codazzi equations always uniquely determine an embedded surface locally. For this reason the Gauss-Codazzi equations are often called the fundamental equations for embedded surfaces, precisely identifying where the intrinsic and extrinsic curvatures come from. They admit generalizations to surfaces embedded in more general Riemannian manifolds.

Isometries 

In terms of the inner product coming from the first fundamental form, this can be rewritten as

.

On the other hand, the length of a parametrized curve  can be calculated as

Conversely if  preserves the lengths of all parametrized in curves then  is an isometry.

The cylinder and the plane give examples of surfaces that are locally isometric but which cannot be extended to an isometry for topological reasons. As another example, the catenoid and helicoid are locally isometric.

Covariant derivatives 

The covariant derivatives (also called "tangential derivatives") of Tullio Levi-Civita and Gregorio Ricci-Curbastro provide a means of differentiating smooth tangential vector fields. There are a few ways to define the covariant derivative; the first below uses the Christoffel symbols and the "intrinsic" definition of tangent vectors, and the second is more manifestly geometric.

where  is the directional derivative. This is often abbreviated in the less cumbersome form , making use of Einstein notation and with the locations of function evaluation being implicitly understood. This follows a standard prescription in Riemannian geometry for obtaining a connection from a Riemannian metric. It is a fundamental fact that the vector

One can also define the covariant derivative by the following geometric approach, which does not make use of Christoffel symbols or local parametrizations. Given any curve , one may consider the composition . The orthogonal projection of this vector onto  defines the covariant derivative .

It is straightforward to check that the two definitions are equivalent. This is discussed in the above section.

The right-hand side of the three Gauss equations can be expressed using covariant differentiation. For instance, the right-hand side

can be recognized as the second coordinate of

In the language of Riemannian geometry, this observation can also be phrased as saying that the right-hand sides of the Gauss equations are various components of the Ricci curvature of the Levi-Civita connection of the first fundamental form, when interpreted as a Riemannian metric.

Examples

Surfaces of revolution

A surface of revolution is obtained by rotating a curve in the -plane about the -axis. Such surfaces include spheres, cylinders, cones, tori, and the catenoid. The general ellipsoids, hyperboloids, and paraboloids are not. Suppose that the curve is parametrized by

with  drawn from an interval .

A local parametrization  is given by

Relative to this parametrization, the geometric data is:

In the special case that the original curve is parametrized by arclength, i.e. , one can differentiate to find . On substitution into the Gaussian curvature, one has the simplified

The simplicity of this formula makes it particularly easy to study the class of rotationally symmetric surfaces with constant Gaussian curvature. By reduction to the alternative case that , one can study the rotationally symmetric minimal surfaces, with the result that any such surface is part of a plane or a scaled catenoid.

Each constant- curve on  can be parametrized as a geodesic; a constant- curve on  can be parametrized as a geodesic if and only if  is equal to zero.

Quadric surfaces

Consider the quadric surface defined by

This surface admits a parametrization

The Gaussian curvature and mean curvature are given by

Ruled surfaces

Choosing a directrix on the surface, i.e. a smooth unit speed curve  orthogonal to the straight lines, and then choosing  to be unit vectors along the curve in the direction of the lines, the velocity vector  and  satisfy

The surface consists of points

Then, if

the Gaussian and mean curvature are given by

More generally a surface in  has vanishing Gaussian curvature near a point if and only if it is developable near that point. (An equivalent condition is given below in terms of the metric.)

Minimal surfaces

In 1760 Lagrange extended Euler's results on the calculus of variations involving integrals in one variable to two variables. He had in mind the following problem:

Such a surface is called a minimal surface.

In 1776 Jean Baptiste Meusnier showed that the differential equation derived by Lagrange was equivalent to the vanishing of the mean curvature of the surface:

Minimal surfaces have a simple interpretation in real life: they are the shape a soap film will assume if a wire frame shaped like the curve is dipped into a soap solution and then carefully lifted out. The question as to whether a minimal surface with given boundary exists is called Plateau's problem after the Belgian physicist Joseph Plateau who carried out experiments on soap films in the mid-nineteenth century. In 1930 Jesse Douglas and Tibor Radó gave an affirmative answer to Plateau's problem (Douglas was awarded one of the first Fields medals for this work in 1936).

Many explicit examples of minimal surface are known explicitly, such as the catenoid, the helicoid, the Scherk surface and the Enneper surface.

Surfaces of constant Gaussian curvature

If a surface has constant Gaussian curvature, it is called a surface of constant curvature.

The unit sphere in  has constant Gaussian curvature +1.
The Euclidean plane and the cylinder both have constant Gaussian curvature 0.
The surfaces of revolution with  have constant Gaussian curvature –1. The latter case is the classical pseudosphere generated by rotating a tractrix around a central axis. In 1868 Eugenio Beltrami showed that the geometry of the pseudosphere was directly related to that of the hyperbolic plane, discovered independently by Lobachevsky (1830) and Bolyai (1832). Already in 1840, F. Minding, a student of Gauss, had obtained trigonometric formulas for the pseudosphere identical to those for the hyperbolic plane. The intrinsic geometry of this surface is now better understood in terms of the Poincaré metric on the upper half plane or the unit disc, and has been described by other models such as the Klein model or the hyperboloid model, obtained by considering the two-sheeted hyperboloid  in three-dimensional Minkowski space, where .

Each of these surfaces of constant curvature has a transitive Lie group of symmetries. This group theoretic fact has far-reaching consequences, all the more remarkable because of the central role these special surfaces play in the geometry of surfaces, due to Poincaré's uniformization theorem (see below).

Other examples of surfaces with Gaussian curvature 0 include cones, tangent developables, and more generally any developable surface.

Local metric structure 

For any surface embedded in Euclidean space of dimension 3 or higher, it is possible to measure the length of a curve on the surface, the angle between two curves and the area of a region on the surface. This structure is encoded infinitesimally in a Riemannian metric on the surface through line elements and area elements. The idea of local parametrization and change of coordinate was later formalized through the current abstract notion of a manifold, a topological space where the smooth structure is given by local charts on the manifold, exactly as the planet Earth is mapped by atlases today. Changes of coordinates between different charts of the same region are required to be smooth. Just as contour lines on real-life maps encode changes in elevation, taking into account local distortions of the Earth's surface to calculate true distances, so the Riemannian metric describes distances and areas "in the small" in each local chart. In each local chart a Riemannian metric is given by smoothly assigning a 2×2 positive definite matrix to each point; when a different chart is taken, the matrix is transformed according to the Jacobian matrix of the coordinate change. The manifold then has the structure of a 2-dimensional Riemannian manifold.

Shape operator

The differential  of the Gauss map  can be used to define a type of extrinsic curvature, known as the shape operator or Weingarten map. This operator first appeared implicitly in the work of Wilhelm Blaschke and later explicitly in a treatise by Burali-Forti and Burgati. Since at each point  of the surface, the tangent space is an inner product space, the shape operator  can be defined as a linear operator on this space by the formula

for tangent vectors ,  (the inner product makes sense because  and  both lie in ). In particular the determinant of the shape operator at a point is the Gaussian curvature, but it also contains other information, since the mean curvature is half the trace of the shape operator. The mean curvature is an extrinsic invariant. In intrinsic geometry, a cylinder is developable, meaning that every piece of it is intrinsically indistinguishable from a piece of a plane since its Gauss curvature vanishes identically. Its mean curvature is not zero, though; hence extrinsically it is different from a plane.

Equivalently, the shape operator can be defined as a linear operator on tangent spaces, Sp: TpM→TpM. If n is a unit normal field to M and v is a tangent vector then 
 
(there is no standard agreement whether to use + or − in the definition).

In general, the eigenvectors and eigenvalues of the shape operator at each point determine the directions in which the surface bends at each point. The eigenvalues correspond to the principal curvatures of the surface and the eigenvectors are the corresponding principal directions. The principal directions specify the directions that a curve embedded in the surface must travel to have maximum and minimum curvature, these being given by the principal curvatures.

Geodesic curves on a surface
Curves on a surface which minimize length between the endpoints are called geodesics; they are the shape that an elastic band stretched between the two points would take. Mathematically they are described using ordinary differential equations and the calculus of variations. The differential geometry of surfaces revolves around the study of geodesics. It is still an open question whether every Riemannian metric on a 2-dimensional local chart arises from an embedding in 3-dimensional Euclidean space: the theory of geodesics has been used to show this is true in the important case when the components of the metric are analytic.

Geodesics

and energy by

The length is independent of the parametrization of a path. By the Euler–Lagrange equations, if  is a path minimising length, parametrized by arclength, it must satisfy the Euler equations

where the Christoffel symbols  are given by

A path satisfying the Euler equations is called a geodesic. By the Cauchy–Schwarz inequality a path minimising energy is just a geodesic parametrised by arc length; and, for any geodesic, the parameter  is proportional to arclength.

Geodesic curvature

The geodesic curvature  at a point of a curve , parametrised by arc length, on an oriented surface is defined to be

where  is the "principal" unit normal to the curve in the surface, constructed by rotating the unit tangent vector  through an angle of +90°.

The geodesic curvature at a point is an intrinsic invariant depending only on the metric near the point.
A unit speed curve on a surface is a geodesic if and only if its geodesic curvature vanishes at all points on the curve.
A unit speed curve  in an embedded surface is a geodesic if and only if its acceleration vector  is normal to the surface.

The geodesic curvature measures in a precise way how far a curve on the surface is from being a geodesic.

Orthogonal coordinates
When  throughout a coordinate chart, such as with the geodesic polar coordinates discussed below, the images of lines parallel to the - and -axes are orthogonal and provide orthogonal coordinates. If , then the Gaussian curvature is given by

If in addition , so that , then the angle  at the intersection between geodesic  and the line  = constant is given by the equation

Geodesic polar coordinates 

Once a metric is given on a surface and a base point is fixed, there is a unique geodesic connecting the base point to each sufficiently nearby point. The direction of the geodesic at the base point and the distance uniquely determine the other endpoint. These two bits of data, a direction and a magnitude, thus determine a tangent vector at the base point. The map from tangent vectors to endpoints smoothly sweeps out a neighbourhood of the base point and defines what is called the "exponential map", defining a local coordinate chart at that base point. The neighbourhood swept out has similar properties to balls in Euclidean space, namely any two points in it are joined by a unique geodesic. This property is called "geodesic convexity" and the coordinates are called "normal coordinates". The explicit calculation of normal coordinates can be accomplished by considering the differential equation satisfied by geodesics. The convexity properties are consequences of Gauss's lemma and its generalisations. Roughly speaking this lemma states that geodesics starting at the base point must cut the spheres of fixed radius centred on the base point at right angles. Geodesic polar coordinates are obtained by combining the exponential map with polar coordinates on tangent vectors at the base point. The Gaussian curvature of the surface is then given by the second order deviation of the metric at the point from the Euclidean metric. In particular the Gaussian curvature is an invariant of the metric, Gauss's celebrated Theorema Egregium. A convenient way to understand the curvature comes from an ordinary differential equation, first considered by Gauss and later generalized by Jacobi, arising from the change of normal coordinates about two different points. The Gauss–Jacobi equation provides another way of computing the Gaussian curvature. Geometrically it explains what happens to geodesics from a fixed base point as the endpoint varies along a small curve segment through data recorded in the Jacobi field, a vector field along the geodesic. One and a quarter centuries after Gauss and Jacobi, Marston Morse gave a more conceptual interpretation of the Jacobi field in terms of second derivatives of the energy function on the infinite-dimensional Hilbert manifold of paths.

Exponential map

Moreover, if , then . The exponential map is defined by
 (1)
The exponential map gives geodesic normal coordinates near .

Computation of normal coordinates
There is a standard technique (see for example ) for computing the change of variables to normal coordinates ,  at a point as a formal Taylor series expansion. If the coordinates ,  at (0,0) are locally orthogonal, write

Gauss's lemma

In these coordinates the matrix  satisfies  and the lines  are geodesics through 0. Euler's equations imply the matrix equation
,
a key result, usually called the Gauss lemma. Geometrically it states that
{| border="1" cellspacing="0" cellpadding="5"
|the geodesics through 0 cut the circles centred at 0 orthogonally.
|}

Taking polar coordinates , it follows that the metric has the form
.
In geodesic coordinates, it is easy to check that the geodesics through zero minimize length. This distance is realised locally by geodesics, so that in normal coordinates .

Theorema Egregium

In particular isometries of surfaces preserve Gaussian curvature.

This theorem can expressed in terms of the power series expansion of the metric, is given in normal coordinates  as
.

Gauss–Jacobi equation

{| border="1" cellspacing="0" cellpadding="5"
|
|}

This gives another way of establishing the intrinsic nature of Gaussian curvature. Because  can be interpreted as the length of the line element in the  direction, the Gauss–Jacobi equation shows that the Gaussian curvature measures the spreading of geodesics on a geometric surface as they move away from a point.

Laplace–Beltrami operator
On a surface with local metric

and Laplace–Beltrami operator

where , the Gaussian curvature at a point is given by the formula

where  denotes the geodesic distance from the point.

In isothermal coordinates, first considered by Gauss, the metric is required to be of the special form

In this case the Laplace–Beltrami operator is given by

and  satisfies Liouville's equation

Isothermal coordinates are known to exist in a neighbourhood of any point on the surface, although all proofs to date rely on non-trivial results on partial differential equations. There is an elementary proof for minimal surfaces.

Gauss–Bonnet theorem 

The constant of proportionality is just the Gaussian curvature, a constant for these surfaces. For the torus, the difference is zero, reflecting the fact that its Gaussian curvature is zero. These are standard results in spherical, hyperbolic and high school trigonometry (see below). Gauss generalised these results to an arbitrary surface by showing that the integral of the Gaussian curvature over the interior of a geodesic triangle is also equal to this angle difference or excess. His formula showed that the Gaussian curvature could be calculated near a point as the limit of area over angle excess for geodesic triangles shrinking to the point. Since any closed surface can be decomposed up into geodesic triangles, the formula could also be used to compute the integral of the curvature over the whole surface. As a special case of what is now called the Gauss–Bonnet theorem, Gauss proved that this integral was remarkably always 2π times an integer, a topological invariant of the surface called the Euler characteristic. This invariant is easy to compute combinatorially in terms of the number of vertices, edges, and faces of the triangles in the decomposition, also called a triangulation. This interaction between analysis and topology was the forerunner of many later results in geometry, culminating in the Atiyah-Singer index theorem. In particular properties of the curvature impose restrictions on the topology of the surface.

Geodesic triangles

where the second equality follows from the Gauss–Jacobi equation and the fourth from Gauss' derivative formula in the orthogonal coordinates .

Gauss' formula shows that the curvature at a point can be calculated as the limit of angle excess  over area for successively smaller geodesic triangles near the point. Qualitatively a surface is positively or negatively curved according to the sign of the angle excess for arbitrarily small geodesic triangles.

Gauss–Bonnet theorem

Since every compact oriented 2-manifold  can be triangulated by small geodesic triangles, it follows that

where  denotes the Euler characteristic of the surface.

In fact if there are  faces,  edges and  vertices, then  and the left hand side equals .

This is the celebrated Gauss–Bonnet theorem: it shows that the integral of the Gaussian curvature is a topological invariant of the manifold, namely the Euler characteristic.

Curvature and embeddings
As Hadamard observed, in this case the surface is convex; this criterion for convexity can be viewed as a 2-dimensional generalisation of the well-known second derivative criterion for convexity of plane curves. Hilbert proved that every isometrically embedded closed surface must have a point of positive curvature.

Surfaces of constant curvature
Each of these has a transitive three-dimensional Lie group of orientation preserving isometries , which can be used to study their geometry. Any other closed Riemannian 2-manifold  of constant Gaussian curvature, after scaling the metric by a constant factor if necessary, will have one of these three surfaces as its universal covering space. For closed surfaces of genus , the moduli space of Riemann surfaces obtained as  varies over all such subgroups, has real dimension . By Poincaré's uniformization theorem, any orientable closed 2-manifold is conformally equivalent to a surface of constant curvature 0, +1 or –1. In other words, by multiplying the metric by a positive scaling factor, the Gaussian curvature can be made to take exactly one of these values (the sign of the Euler characteristic of ).

Euclidean geometry

In the case of the Euclidean plane, the symmetry group is the Euclidean motion group, the semidirect product of
the two dimensional group of translations by the group of rotations.

Spherical geometry

The geodesics between two points on the sphere are the great circle arcs with these given endpoints. If the points are not antipodal, there is a unique shortest geodesic between the points. The geodesics can also be described group theoretically: each geodesic through the North pole (0,0,1) is the orbit of the subgroup of rotations about an axis through antipodal points on the equator.

A spherical triangle is a geodesic triangle on the sphere.

The area of the triangle is given by
.

Using stereographic projection from the North pole, the sphere can be identified with the extended complex plane . The explicit map is given by

With respect to the coordinates  in the complex plane, the spherical metric becomes

The unit sphere is the unique closed orientable surface with constant curvature +1. The quotient  can be identified with the real projective plane. The sphere is simply connected, while the real projective plane has fundamental group .

Hyperbolic geometry

Non-Euclidean geometry was first discussed in letters of Gauss, who made extensive computations at the turn of the nineteenth century which, although privately circulated, he decided not to put into print. In 1830 Lobachevsky and independently in 1832 Bolyai, the son of one Gauss' correspondents, published synthetic versions of this new geometry, for which they were severely criticized. However it was not until 1868 that Beltrami, followed by Klein in 1871 and Poincaré in 1882, gave concrete analytic models for what Klein dubbed hyperbolic geometry. The four models of 2-dimensional hyperbolic geometry that emerged were:
the Beltrami-Klein model;
the Poincaré disk;
the Poincaré upper half-plane;
the hyperboloid model of Wilhelm Killing in 3-dimensional Minkowski space.

The first model, based on a disk, has the advantage that geodesics are actually line segments (that is, intersections of Euclidean lines with the open unit disk). The last model has the advantage that it gives a construction which is completely parallel to that of the unit sphere in 3-dimensional Euclidean space. Because of their application in complex analysis and geometry, however, the models of Poincaré are the most widely used: they are interchangeable thanks to the Möbius transformations between the disk and the upper half-plane.

Let

be the Poincaré disk in the complex plane with Poincaré metric

In polar coordinates  the metric is given by

The length of a curve  is given by the formula

The group  given by

The topology defined by this metric is equivalent to the usual Euclidean topology, although as a metric space  is complete.

The area of the hyperbolic triangle is given by
.

The unit disk and the upper half-plane

are conformally equivalent by the Möbius transformations

The metric on  becomes

Since lines or circles are preserved under Möbius transformations, geodesics are again described by lines or circles orthogonal to the real axis.

The unit disk with the Poincaré metric is the unique simply connected oriented 2-dimensional Riemannian manifold with constant curvature −1. Any oriented closed surface  with this property has  as its universal covering space.

In this case  is a finitely presented group.

Examples.
 the Bolza surface of genus 2;
 the Klein quartic of genus 3;
 the Macbeath surface of genus 7;
 the First Hurwitz triplet of genus 14.

Uniformization

Given an oriented closed surface  with Gaussian curvature , the metric on  can be changed conformally by scaling it by a factor . The new Gaussian curvature  is then given by

where  is the Laplacian for the original metric. Thus to show that a given surface is conformally equivalent to a metric with constant curvature  it suffices to solve the following variant of Liouville's equation:

When  has Euler characteristic 0, so is diffeomorphic to a torus, so this amounts to solving

When  has negative Euler characteristic, so the equation to be solved is:

Using the continuity of the exponential map on Sobolev space due to Neil Trudinger, this non-linear equation can always be solved.

Finally in the case of the 2-sphere,  and the equation becomes:

So far this non-linear equation has not been analysed directly, although classical results such as the Riemann–Roch theorem imply that it always has a solution. The method of Ricci flow, developed by Richard S. Hamilton, gives another proof of existence based on non-linear partial differential equations to prove existence.

After finite time, Chow showed that  becomes positive; previous results of Hamilton could then be used to show that  converges to +1.

The equation , has a smooth solution , because the right hand side has integral 0 by the Gauss–Bonnet theorem.

Riemannian connection and parallel transport

The classical approach of Gauss to the differential geometry of surfaces was the standard elementary approach which predated the emergence of the concepts of Riemannian manifold initiated by Bernhard Riemann in the mid-nineteenth century and of connection developed by Tullio Levi-Civita, Élie Cartan and Hermann Weyl in the early twentieth century. The notion of connection, covariant derivative and parallel transport gave a more conceptual and uniform way of understanding curvature, which not only allowed generalisations to higher dimensional manifolds but also provided an important tool for defining new geometric invariants, called characteristic classes. The approach using covariant derivatives and connections is nowadays the one adopted in more advanced textbooks.

Covariant derivative
Connections on a surface can be defined from various equivalent but equally important points of view. The Riemannian connection or Levi-Civita connection. is perhaps most easily understood in terms of lifting vector fields, considered as first order differential operators acting on functions on the manifold, to differential operators on the tangent bundle or frame bundle. In the case of an embedded surface, the lift to an operator on vector fields, called the covariant derivative, is very simply described in terms of orthogonal projection. Indeed, a vector field on a surface embedded in  can be regarded as a function from the surface into . Another vector field acts as a differential operator component-wise. The resulting vector field will not be tangent to the surface, but this can be corrected taking its orthogonal projection onto the tangent space at each point of the surface. As Ricci and Levi-Civita realised at the turn of the twentieth century, this process depends only on the metric and can be locally expressed in terms of the Christoffel symbols.

Parallel transport
Parallel transport of tangent vectors along a curve in the surface was the next major advance in the subject, due to Levi-Civita. It is related to the earlier notion of covariant derivative, because it is the monodromy of the ordinary differential equation on the curve defined by the covariant derivative with respect to the velocity vector of the curve. Parallel transport along geodesics, the "straight lines" of the surface, can also easily be described directly. A vector in the tangent plane is transported along a geodesic as the unique vector field with constant length and making a constant angle with the velocity vector of the geodesic. For a general curve, this process has to be modified using the geodesic curvature, which measures how far the curve departs from being a geodesic.

A vector field  along a unit speed curve , with geodesic curvature , is said to be parallel along the curve if
 it has constant length
 the angle  that it makes with the velocity vector  satisfies

This recaptures the rule for parallel transport along a geodesic or piecewise geodesic curve, because in that case , so that the angle  should remain constant on any geodesic segment. The existence of parallel transport follows because  can be computed as the integral of the geodesic curvature.

The connection can thus be described in terms of lifting paths in the manifold to paths in the tangent or orthonormal frame bundle, thus formalising the classical theory of the "moving frame", favoured by French authors. Lifts of loops about a point give rise to the holonomy group at that point. The Gaussian curvature at a point can be recovered from parallel transport around increasingly small loops at the point. Equivalently curvature can be calculated directly at an infinitesimal level in terms of Lie brackets of lifted vector fields.

Connection 1-form
They noticed that parallel transport dictates that a path in the surface be lifted to a path in the frame bundle so that its tangent vectors lie in a special subspace of codimension one in the three-dimensional tangent space of the frame bundle. The projection onto this subspace is defined by a differential 1-form on the orthonormal frame bundle, the connection form. This enabled the curvature properties of the surface to be encoded in differential forms on the frame bundle and formulas involving their exterior derivatives.

This approach is particularly simple for an embedded surface.

Global differential geometry of surfaces
Although the characterisation of curvature involves only the local geometry of a surface, there are important global aspects such as the Gauss–Bonnet theorem, the uniformization theorem, the von Mangoldt-Hadamard theorem, and the embeddability theorem. There are other important aspects of the global geometry of surfaces. These include:

Rigidity. Moreover, a closed embedded surface with positive Gaussian curvature and constant mean curvature is necessarily a sphere; likewise a closed embedded surface of constant Gaussian curvature must be a sphere (Liebmann 1899). Heinz Hopf showed in 1950 that a closed embedded surface with constant mean curvature and genus 0, i.e. homeomorphic to a sphere, is necessarily a sphere; five years later Alexandrov removed the topological assumption. In the 1980s, Wente constructed immersed tori of constant mean curvature in Euclidean 3-space.
Carathéodory conjecture: This conjecture states that a closed convex three times differentiable surface admits at least two umbilic points. The first work on this conjecture was in 1924 by Hans Hamburger, who noted that it follows from the following stronger claim: the half-integer valued index of the principal curvature foliation of an isolated umbilic is at most one.

The Willmore conjecture. It is known that the integral is Moebius invariant. It was solved in 2012 by Fernando Codá Marques and André Neves.
Isoperimetric inequalities. In 1939 Schmidt proved that the classical isoperimetric inequality for curves in the Euclidean plane is also valid on the sphere or in the hyperbolic plane: namely he showed that among all closed curves bounding a domain of fixed area, the perimeter is minimized by when the curve is a circle for the metric. In one dimension higher, it is known that among all closed surfaces in  arising as the boundary of a bounded domain of unit volume, the surface area is minimized for a Euclidean ball.
Systolic inequalities for curves on surfaces. Given a closed surface, its systole is defined to be the smallest length of any non-contractible closed curve on the surface. A similar result is given by Pu's inequality for the real projective plane from 1952, with a lower bound of  also attained in the constant curvature case. Three years later Mikhail Gromov found a lower bound given by a constant times , although this is not optimal. There is also a version for metrics on the sphere, taking for the systole the length of the smallest closed geodesic.

Reading guide

See also
Flatness (mathematics)
Tangent vector
Zoll surface

Notes

References 

; translated from the Russian by K. Vogtmann and A. Weinstein.

; translated from 2nd edition of  Leçons sur la géométrie des espaces de Riemann (1951) by James Glazebrook.
 ; translated from Russian by V. V. Goldberg with a foreword by S. S. Chern.

 Volume I (1887), Volume II (1915) [1889], Volume III (1894), Volume IV (1896).

.
.
 translated by A.M. Hiltebeitel and J.C. Morehead; "Disquisitiones generales circa superficies curvas", Commentationes Societatis Regiae Scientiarum Gottingesis Recentiores Vol. VI (1827), pp. 99–146.
.
.

 

,

 Ian R. Porteous (2001) Geometric Differentiation: for the intelligence of curves and surfaces, Cambridge University Press .

 Full text of book

External links